The Slovak Youth Orchestra (SMO) is the national youth orchestra of Slovakia. Founded in 2016 in Bratislava, it consists of 80 musicians aged 16 to 28.

The orchestra is a member of the European Federation of National Youth Orchestras. It performed at Young Euro Classic 2019.

See also 
 List of youth orchestras

References 

Music education organizations
National youth orchestras
Slovak orchestras
European youth orchestras
Musical groups established in 2016
2016 establishments in Slovakia